Shop is also known as soap and sop, a village located in Uniara Tehsil of Tonk, a district of the state of Rajasthan in Western India.

Geography 
Shop is located at 25.892296°N 76.210446°E, and covers a total area of 2262.89 km2.

Shop is situated to the north of Uniyara Tehsil and five kilometers west of Delhi-Mumbai Expressway. There are five Anganwadi centers, two banks - Gramin Bank and Indian Iverseas Bank, and a sub tehsil office. There is a hostipal.

Historical Places 

Shop has a palatial stepwell made of curved stairs and huge rocks. Talghar Lal Chowk and Lal Bazaar Bhawan Kund are built inside this stepwell. This stepwell is famous as the stepwell of Singhasha Baba.

Demographics 
The total population of Shop is 5,482 with 3,835 voters. Kiskanda Bai won the sarpanch post in the Gram panchayat elections for 2020. There are two dhanis here: Manoharpura Malian and Khanjar Dhani. The town still employs the caste system. Some of the major castes at Shop include Dhakad, Meena, Gurjar, and Mali.

Economy 
Shop's economy is agrarian. Some crops produced include wheat and mustard, which are grown as Rabi crops; Urad, moong, maize and millet, which are grown as Kharif crops. The village also has a pond (Amalia), where Singahara is cultivated.

References

External links 
Census of India 2001

Villages in Tonk district